Dawson Peak is a prominent ice-free peak,  high,  southwest of Mount Picciotto in the Queen Elizabeth Range. It was named by the Advisory Committee on Antarctic Names after John A. Dawson, a United States Antarctic Research Program aurora scientist at South Pole Station, 1958.

References 

Mountains of the Ross Dependency
Shackleton Coast